The Nissan L series of automobile engines was produced from 1967 through 1986 in both inline-four and inline-six configurations ranging from 1.3 L to 2.8 L. It is a two-valves per cylinder SOHC non-crossflow engine, with an iron block and an aluminium head. It was the engine of the Datsun 510, Datsun 240Z sports car, and the Nissan Maxima. These engines are known for their reliability, durability, and parts interchangeability.

The L16 four-cylinder design was influenced by the Mercedes-Benz M180 engine that the Prince Motor Company developed in four- and six-cylinder displacements called the Prince G engine.

The six-cylinder L20 was rushed into production by Datsun in 1966 and was designed prior to the Prince merger using the Mercedes overhead cam engine as a model.  Due to design and reliability problems it proved short-lived, and was replaced by the L16-based L20A.

The four-cylinder L series engines were replaced with the Z series and later the CA series, while the six-cylinder L series engines were replaced with the VG series and RB series.

Straight-four

L13
The L13 was a  engine with a bore and stroke of  that appeared in 1967. It was not available in the United States, but Canada received it in 1968 only. It produces  SAE at 6,000 rpm (export models). In the Japanese market, the JIS rating was used and the figure is  SAE at the same engine speed. Torque is  SAE or  JIS at 3,600 rpm. The L13 was essentially a short-stroke L16.

Applications:
 Nissan Bluebird (510)

L14
The  L14 was destined for most of the world, but was never offered in the US. 

Specifications

Bore x stroke  (.

85PS / 6,000rpm 11.8kg · m / 3,600rpm (single carb specification)

95PS / 6,400rpm 12.4kg · m / 4,000rpm ( SU twin carburetor specification)
 1968–1973 Nissan Bluebird (510)
 Nissan Violet/140J (J710/J711)
 1971–1973 Datsun Sunny Excellent (PB110)
 1971–1973 Datsun Sunny Excellent - Coupé (KPB110) (April 1971)
 1973–1976 Nissan Sunny Excellent (PB210)
 1973-1974 Datsun 140Z (PB210) L14 with twin Dell'Orto carburetors and performance cam (South Africa special) 
 1975 Nissan GR-1 concept

L16
The L16 was a  Inline-four engine, fed by a 2-barrel Hitachi-SU carburettor, produced from 1967 through 1973 for the Nissan Bluebird, sold as the Datsun 510 in North America. Learning lessons from the original L20, the L16 was given a full design and development cycle in Nissan's Small Engine Division, resulting in a superior design that proved itself over time and served as the basis for the later L24 and L20A. The L16 also formed the basis of Nissan's "Modular L Series" lineup well into the 1980s. The L16 replaced the Prince G-16 in 1975.

Applications:
 1967–1973 Nissan Bluebird (P510)
 1968–1973 Datsun 510
 1970–1972 Datsun 521 pick-up
 1971–1977 Nissan 160B sedan (610)
 1972–1973 Datsun 620 pick-up
 1973–1977 Nissan Violet/Datsun 160J (P710/P711)
 1977–1978 Nissan Violet/Auster/Stanza/160J (A10)

When this engine was installed in a 1972 Canadian 510 sedan model with manual transmission, two sets of points were installed in the distributor and this second set of points was in circuit only in third gear to obtain a different dwell angle. A similar arrangement exists in the US-spec 510/610 cars and 521/620 pickup trucks for the years 1970-1973.

L16S

The L16S was an engine that was used in the 910 Bluebird sedan and van/wagon. This engine was equipped with an electronically controlled carburetor.

Applications:
 Nissan Bluebird (910)

L16T

The L16T was basically the same as the L16 but had twin SU carbs, flat top pistons (same as ones used in 240Z) and a slightly different head. It produces .

Applications:
 Nissan Bluebird (510) - At least in European version, where it was known as Datsun 1600SSS (P(L)510), 1968-1972.
 Datsun 160Z (B210), specific to the South African market where it was assembled.
Note the L in PL was for left hand drive models.

L16P

The L16P is the LPG version of the L16.

Applications:
 Nissan Bluebird (510)
 Nissan Violet (710)

L18

It produces  at 5,000 rpm in the most common trim. The L18 replaced the Prince G-18 in 1975. All variants used the same camshaft lobe lift. The L18 was a popular powerplant in many non-USA markets due to its under-2-liters displacement, which made it exempt from many fuel and classification tariffs.

 1971-1976 Nissan Bluebird/Datsun 180B
 1973 Nissan Bluebird/Datsun 1600 SSS (P510)
 1973 Datsun 610
 1974 Datsun 620 truck
 1974 Datsun 710
 1979–1981 Nissan Silvia/Datsun 180SX (S110)
 1980–1986 Datsun 720 (Middle East)
 Datsun 810

L18S

The L18S was an  engine that was used in the 910 bluebird Sedan and S10 Silvia.

Applications:
 1979 Datsun Bluebird (910)
 1975–1979 Nissan Silvia/Datsun 180SX (S10)

L18E 
The L18E was an  engine that was used in the S11 Silvia. The L18E is an upgraded version of the L18S, but with electronic fuel injection rather than a carburetor, that produces  at 6,200 rpm. The L18E was added in the S11 Silvia's 1976 upgrade for the "Type-LSE" trim level.

Applications:

 1976–1979 Nissan Silvia/Datsun 180SX (S10)

L18T

The L18T  was basically the same as the L18 but had twin SU carbs, higher compression pistons, and lower volume combustion chambers. A high lift cam,  bigger inlet valves and  bigger exhaust valves were also fitted. It was installed into the 610-series Bluebird 180B SSS and UK market 910-U Bluebird 1.8 GL coupé. It produces . Also used in the Bluebird SSS Hardtop Coupé (910) for General LHD markets.

L18P

The L18P is the LPG version of the L18 engine.

Applications:
 Datsun Bluebird 810
 Datsun Bluebird 710

L20B

The L20B engine introduced larger-diameter  main bearings while retaining a fully counterweighted crankshaft. The forged U60 crankshaft also ushered in the use of a six-bolt flywheel boss. The block introduced a taller deck height to accommodate the longer stroke and connecting rods. This specification would also be used later in the Z20 and Z22 engine series. The bigger powerplant even helped spawn an important new offering from Datsun's competition department - Solex twin-choke carburetor kits- complete fuel systems that help produce nearly double the power from the ubiquitous L20B. The legendary robustness and nearly square configuration have made this engine a popular choice among tuners for turbocharging.

The engine used a carburetor but switched to fuel injection (and round instead of square exhaust ports) in some non-USA markets in 1977. Carburetors were used in all US L20B applications for both cars and trucks. In the US, the L20B was used in six different model families -A10, 610, 710, S10, 620, and 720 models- making it the most versatile powerplant in the company's US history. To avoid confusion with the six-cylinder L20, Nissan designated this engine the L20B.

 1974–1976 Datsun 610
 1975–1977 Datsun 710
 1975–1979 Datsun 620 
 1975–1979 Datsun 200SX (S10)
 1977–1981 Datsun 200B
 1978–1981 Datsun 510
 1979.5–1980 Datsun 720
 1981-198? Nissan/Datsun Skyline R30 (South Africa)

LZ (competition)

The "LZ" twin cam head was designed to give a power boost to the Datsun L series engine for competition purposes. 
  
There are two different LZ cylinder heads. The early head is the same thickness as a normal L series head. The engine using the first head was referred to as the L14 twin cam. There was no mention of Z in the title. This L14 twin cam head engine has flat exit side exhaust ports, the early 12 bolt rocker cover and the coolant discharge on the inlet side of the head. All early twin cam engines appear to have the 14 bolt rocker cover (6 for the cover and 8 for the bolt-in plug holders). Later engines use the full flat cover with six bolts to secure it.

The LZ engine was built purely for Datsun/Nissan competition use. Engine size can vary between 1400 cc (LZ14) in the PB110 "1200", 1600 cc in the PB210, 1800 CC in the 710  2.0 litres in the PA10 Stanza, to 2.2 liter in the 910 bluebird rally cars. The naturally aspirated LZ engines used  Solex carburettors depending on capacity. The LZ engine found its way into many categories, from "Datsun Works" rally cars, Formula Pacific, Group 4 (racing), Group 5 (racing) and Group C.

In some Japanese racing classes the LZ engine is fitted with low compression pistons and a "T05B" turbocharger. These engines are electronically fuel injected. A very successful example of the LZ turbo was in the famous Japanese "White Lightning" Silvia and "Tomica" R30 Skyline, both driven by Hoshino in the mid 1980s. The LZ turbo engine was also used in the 1986 Nissan March 85G Le Mans car.

The original LZ20B turbo engine used in the 1983 Nissan Silvia (S12) "White Lightning" Group 5 race car, produced  at 8,000 rpm.

The LZ14 engine for the Formula Pacific race cars produces  at 10,200 rpm. For qualifying and non endurance events the LZ14 can be tweaked to produce  at 11,000 rpm.

The LZ engine uses a standard L series engine block to mount the DOHC cylinder head. Usually the bottom end is dry sumped using a Tsubakimoto dry sump pump. The crankshaft used is a Nismo chrome moly "8 bolt flywheel" type. Connecting rods are various length, Cosworth style, to suit the engine stroke. The rod caps have aircraft grade rod bolts and are dowelled. Pistons are thin ring forged units.

The head was available for purchase from Nissan (Nismo) and was sanctioned by the FIA. The LZ14  was used during the 1973 Japanese GP, taking the top three positions. In open wheeler "Formula Pacific" racing the LZ14 engine dominated competition in most events it was entered in. It received multiple top rankings in some events.

LD20/LD20T

There was also a diesel version of the four-cylinder L-series, used in amongst others the Bluebird 910 and the Vanette. Strangely, it was not installed in the 720 pickup (which has the SD22/25 when diesel powered) although the gas versions most often has the L-series engine. However, in case of a conversion of a gas powered 720 to diesel, it will be much easier to use a LD20 because it fits on the original gearbox and engine mounts.)

LD20
 diesel engine pre-combustion chamber

Models:
Vanette (C120)
Largo (GC120)

LD20 II
Introduced in 1986, the LD20 II has a differently shaped combustion chamber.

Models:
Bluebird (910 and U11)
Vanette (C22)
Largo (GC22)

LD20T/LD20T II

Models:
Bluebird (U11)
Largo (GC120 & GC22)
Homy / Caravan (E23 & E24)

OS Giken DOHC cylinder head (16-valve)

In 1974, Osamu Okazaki designed a dual overhead cam, 16-valve cylinder head as an upgrade to the four-cylinder variant of the L-series engines, and manufactured it through his automotive performance company, OS Giken. This cylinder head also significantly improved the performance of the engine by using a more modern crossflow cylinder head design, compared to the original which used a reverse flow design.  A naturally aspirated version of this engine produced .

Straight-six

L20/L20A

The L20 is a SOHC 12-valve engine produced from 1966. The original L20 was plagued by problems caused by its rushed development and was short lived.

A new L20, designated L20A, was introduced in 1970 and was based on the design of the L16. The L20A was used in HLC210 (Nissan Laurel/Datsun 200L, 75-77), G610 Bluebird U 2000 GT and GTX, 230/330 Series Cedrics, HIJC31 (Laurel, 81-85), and Fairlady Z (1970–1983). It produces .

L20ET

The L20ET is a turbo engine developed from the L20E. It is a 12-valve, six-cylinder, fuel-injected engine with a single chain driven cam, turbo (non intercooled), and a non crossflow head. It produces .

It was released in the late 1970s  and fitted to the Skyline C210 and R30, Laurel, Leopard, Cedric, Gloria, and early Fairlady Z lines of automobiles.

This engine was the first engine out of Japan to ever receive a turbo.

L20P

The L20P is the LPG version of the L20 engine.

Applications:
 Nissan Cedric (330, 430 and Y30)
 Nissan Gloria (330, 430 and Y30)

L23

The L23 was a  engine produced in 1968. It produces . This engine was produced in limited numbers and was replaced by the L24 the following year. The L23 was based on the design of the original L20.

Applications:
 1968-69 Nissan Cedric Personal Six, Special Six and Super Six

L24

The L24 was a  engine produced from 1969 through 1984. It produces  and the version with twin side draught SU Carburettors produces .

A single carburetor version of the same engine was also standard in the Laurel sedan (240L) for various export markets, in the years 1982-1984. While the last generation Cedric to use this engine in Japan was the 230-series (1971–1975), Yue Loong of Taiwan installed it in 430-series Cedrics at least as late as 1984.

 1970–1973 Datsun 240Z—
 1970–1971 Nissan Cedric/Gloria 130
1970–1972 Nissan Skyline 2400GT (C10)
 1971–1972 Nissan Cedric/Gloria 230
 1972–1977 Datsun 240K (C110)
 1978–1981 Datsun 240K-GT (C210)
 1979–1980 Nissan Laurel C230
 1980–1984 Nissan Laurel C31 (export)

L24E

Electronic fuel injection was added for the L24E, produced from 1977 through 1986.  This engine was used in export market cars only and was never sold in Japan.

 1977–1980 Datsun 810
 1981 Datsun 810
 1981–1985 Nissan Skyline R30
 1982–1983 Datsun Maxima
 1984 Nissan Maxima
 1984–1990 Nissan Laurel C32

L26

The L26 is the larger . It was produced from 1973 through 1978. It produces . In 1975, the L26 replaced the Prince G-20.

Applications:
 1972–1975 Nissan Cedric (230 Series)
 1974–1977 Nissan Laurel (C130)
 1974 Datsun 260Z 1974 for North America. 260Z sold in other countries until 1978
 1976–1978 Nissan Cedric (330 Series)

L28

The L28 is a  12-valve engine. The basic L28 is carbureted.

Applications:
 1975–1977 Nissan Laurel C130
 1977–1979 Nissan Gloria 330
 1978 Dome Zero
 1978–1979 Nissan Cedric 330
 1980–1989 Nissan Patrol 160
 1982–1987 Datsun/Nissan Skyline R30 (South Africa)
 1986–2002 Nissan Patrol 260

L28E

The L28E is the enlarged  engine produced from 1975 to 1984 equipped with dish-top pistons from 1975 to 1978 and 1979 to 1983 with flat top pistons and a resulting compression ratio of 8.3:1. The E stands for electronic multiport fuel injection, provided by Bosch using the L-Jetronic system, and is one of the first Japanese produced vehicles to introduce the technology.

 1975–1978 Datsun 280Z
 1975–1986 Dome Zero
 1979–1983 Datsun 280ZX
 1980–1982 Nissan Leopard F30
 1980–1989 Nissan Patrol 160
 Nissan Cedric
 Nissan Gloria
 Nissan AD-2 concept

L28ET

The L28E was turbocharged in December 1980 to produce the L28ET for the 280ZX Turbo. The L28ET was produced through June 1983. The early versions had adjustable mechanical rockers though these were phased out after September 1982 in favor of hydraulic rockers. This engine was considered too powerful by Japan's Ministry of Transportation, who would only allow turbochargers to be installed in sub 2 litre-engined cars, and was therefore very limited in sales in its homeland.

The L28ET used a single Garrett AiResearch TB03 internally wastegated turbocharger and no intercooler. Other modest changes were made to the turbo model, with static compression reduced to 7.4:1, and automatic transmission models were given a higher-volume oil pump. The most significant change aside from the turbocharger itself was the introduction of a new engine control system, Nissan's Electronic Concentrated Control System (ECCS).

Applications:
 Datsun 280ZX Turbo

LD28

The LD28 is the diesel-version of the L28 engine. Robust 7-main bearing block design, like all L-series six-cylinder engines. Bore and stroke are  respectively.

LD28

pre-combustion chamber

Power outputs:

 Nissan Gloria 430 and Y30 (1980 - 1985)
 Nissan Cedric 430 and Y30
 Nissan Laurel C31 and C32 (1980 - 1987)
 Nissan Skyline C210 and R30
 Datsun 810 G910
 Datsun Maxima G910
 Albin 27 boats from 1982 to 1992/3

LD28T (turbocharged)

A turbocharged version of the LD28 diesel engine. There are no factory turbocharged LD28 engines available in the US market, nor has Nissan ever equipped any of its US-market cars/light trucks with a turbo-diesel engine. LD28Ts are only found in Japan, Australasia/New Zealand, southern Africa and parts of Europe.

Nissan also marketed LD28Ts as bare engines for genset and stationary engine uses and may be also found in maritime version.

Applications:
Nissan Patrol (Y60 & Y61 Safari export version)
Nissan Laurel (Euro only)

OS Giken DOHC cylinder head (24-valve)

OS Giken released a 24-valve version of the DOHC cylinder head for the six-cylinder version of the L-series engines, shortly after producing the 16-valve version for the four-cylinder L-series engines. It produced  in naturally aspirated form, with a rev-limit of 9000 rpm.

In 2013, a redesigned version of the 24-valve DOHC cylinder head was released. Osamu Okazaki says that he redesigned every component with more modern technology and materials. The rev-limit of this newer model is 10,000 rpm, and a naturally aspirated version of this engine produces .

See also
 List of Nissan engines

References

External links
 New Zealand Datsun Club

L
Straight-four engines
Straight-six engines
Diesel engines by model
Gasoline engines by model